Phyllis Delma Dewar (March 5, 1916 – April 8, 1961), also known by her married name Phyllis Lowery, was a Canadian competition swimmer and freestyle specialist.  At the 1936 Summer Olympics in Berlin, Germany, she was a member of the Canadian relay team that finished fourth in the women's 4×100-metre freestyle relay.  In the 100-metre freestyle, she advanced to the semifinals of the event before being eliminated.

In the 1934 British Empire Games in London, she won gold medals in the 100-yard and 440-yard freestyle events and in two relays.  Four years later, at the 1938 Empire Games in Sydney, she won her fifth gold medal in the 4×110-yard freestyle relay.

Early life
Dewar was born on March 5, 1916, in Moose Jaw, Saskatchewan. She began swimming during her early childhood.

Career
In the mid-1930s, Dewar was the Canadian freestyle record holder in numerous freestyle events including the 100-yard and one-mile races. In international competitions, she won four gold medals at the 1934 British Empire Games and her final gold at the 1938 British Empire Games. She also competed at the 1936 Summer Olympics but did not medal. After ending her swimming career in the late 1930s, Dewar served in the Women's Royal Canadian Naval Service.

Awards and honors
In 1934, Dewar was the recipient of both the Bobbie Rosenfeld Award and Velma Springstead Trophy as the best Canadian female athlete of that year. Dewar was posthumously inducted into the Saskatchewan Sports Hall of Fame in 1967. Other posthumous inductions include Canada's Sports Hall of Fame in 1971 and the Canadian Olympic Hall of Fame in 1972.

Death
Dewar died on April 8, 1961, in Toronto, Ontario.

Personal life
Dewar was married with four children.

References

 
  with picture

1916 births
1961 deaths
Canadian female freestyle swimmers
Commonwealth Games gold medallists for Canada
Olympic swimmers of Canada
Sportspeople from Moose Jaw
Swimmers at the 1934 British Empire Games
Swimmers at the 1936 Summer Olympics
Swimmers at the 1938 British Empire Games
Commonwealth Games medallists in swimming
Medallists at the 1934 British Empire Games
Medallists at the 1938 British Empire Games